Jean de Dinteville (1504–1555) was a French diplomat. He is the left-hand figure in Holbein's 1533 painting The Ambassadors, painted whilst he was French ambassador to London, and which he presumably commissioned.  Dinteville's motto was Memento mori, meaning "Remember thou shalt die."

References

External links
 oneonta.edu

See also
François de Dinteville (1498-1530), his brother

1504 births
1555 deaths
Ambassadors of France to England
16th-century French diplomats
People of the Tudor period
16th-century French people